William Emmanuel Evans (5 September 1921 – 26 July 1960) was an English professional footballer who played as a inside forward. He died of lung cancer in Grimsby in 1960, aged 38.

References

1921 births
1960 deaths
English footballers
Footballers from Birmingham, West Midlands
Association football forwards
Gillingham F.C. players
Aston Villa F.C. players
Notts County F.C. players
Grimsby Town F.C. players